Waiting for God is the self-titled debut studio album of Waiting for God, released in late 1994 by KMG. The album was re-issued as Quarter Inch Thick by Re-Constriction Records in 1996 with an expanded track listing featuring bonus remixes.

Reception
Aiding & Abetting gave Waiting for God a positive review, saying "there are plenty of diverse elements woven into this fabric" and "Daemon Cadman's lighter-than-air vocals mix well with the edgy guitars and sea of keyboards brought in by the rest of the band." Sonic Boom also praised Cadman's vocal prowess, saying "the steadfast vocal style and the music coupled together create a very unique sound that lacks any obvious evidence of outside musical influence that plagues many a new band." Scott Hefflon of Lollipop Magazine gave the album a more mixed review and criticized the material for being too dance oriented.

Track listing

Personnel
Adapted from the Waiting for God liner notes.

Waiting for God
 Daemon Cadman – lead vocals
 Martin Myers – guitar, keyboards, programming
 Greg Price – drums

Additional performers
 Doug Nolan – guitar (2)
 Jed Simon – guitar (1)

Production and design
 Cyberkrishna Media – design
 Tom Ferris – production, mixing

Release history

References

External links 
 

1994 debut albums
Waiting for God (band) albums
Re-Constriction Records albums
Synthetic Symphony albums